Campbellton-Restigouche Centre was a provincial electoral district for the Legislative Assembly of New Brunswick, Canada.

The riding was created as Campbellton in the 1967 redistribution when cities were removed from county districts and is made up of the City of Campbellton and the villages of Tide Head and Atholville and their surrounding areas.  It returned one member from its inception and was unchanged in the 1973 redistribution when New Brunswick moved exclusively to single member districts.

The riding was again largely unchanged in the 1994 redistribution.  In the 2006 redistribution it gained some geographical territory from the parts of Restigouche County to its south and was renamed as a result.

Members of the Legislative Assembly

Election results

Campbellton-Restigouche Centre

Campbellton

References

External links 
Website of the Legislative Assembly of New Brunswick

Former provincial electoral districts of New Brunswick
Campbellton, New Brunswick